Solomon (Inupiaq: Aaŋuutaq) is an unincorporated community in the Nome Census Area of the Unorganized Borough of Alaska. As of the 2010 census, the population was zero (uninhabited), down from four in 2000.

The Solomon State Field Airport is located near Solomon. The nearest town is Nome, Alaska.

History
Solomon was originally settled by the Fish River tribe. It became a mining camp and then a town in the early 1900s. The first post office was established in 1900 under the direction of Postmaster Otto Weihe, an 1899 graduate of the California College of Pharmacy. In 1913, a violent storm destroyed the railroad, along with the rest of the town. The surviving residents were forced to relocate to the recently abandoned Dickson. In 1918, the worldwide influenza epidemic struck Solomon.

Demographics

Solomon first appeared on the 1940 U.S. Census as an unincorporated village. It returned again in 1950, but would not appear afterwards until 1980, when it was designated an Alaskan Native Village Statistical Area (ANVSA). Though reported as uninhabited in 2010, it has a number of private seasonal cabins.

Area information
The school district is the Bering Strait School District in Unalakleet, Alaska. The former settlement of Dickson was directly across the Solomon River on its eastern shore.

The Nome/Council Road goes through Solomon and is the only street. The Solomon State Field Airport is a gravel airstrip that runs charter flights from Nome.

There is a single bed and breakfast in Solomon. It operates during the summer and is used heavily by government survey crews.

References

Unincorporated communities in Alaska
Unincorporated communities in Nome Census Area, Alaska
Unincorporated communities in Unorganized Borough, Alaska
Populated places in the Seward Peninsula